Gasparilla Island State Park is a Florida State Park located south of Boca Grande on Gasparilla Island off Charlotte Harbor and Pine Island Sound. Activities include swimming and fishing along with shelling, picnicking, and viewing the Historic Port Boca Grande Lighthouse. 

Among the wildlife of the park are West Indian manatee, gopher tortoise, bald eagle, osprey, least tern, royal tern, Sandwich tern, and black skimmer.

Amenities include four parking lots, two picnic areas with covered tables, beaches, and Historic Port Boca Grande Lighthouse on the southern end of the island.  The Port Boca Grande Lighthouse contains a museum and gift shop, and is run by the Barrier Island Park Society, a nonprofit that supports the Gasparilla Island State Park.

Gallery

References and external links

 Gasparilla Island State Park at Florida State Parks
 Gasparilla Island State Recreation Area at Absolutely Florida
 Gasparilla Island State Recreation Area at Wildernet

Parks in Charlotte County, Florida
Parks in Lee County, Florida
State parks of Florida
Beaches of Florida
Protected areas established in 1983
1983 establishments in Florida
Beaches of Charlotte County, Florida
Gasparilla Island